Lafystiidae is a family of crustaceans belonging to the order Amphipoda.

Genera:
 Lafystius Krøyer, 1842
 Paralafystius Bousfield, 1987
 Protolafystius Bousfield, 1987

References

Amphipoda